Acutandra is a genus of beetles in the family Cerambycidae, containing the following species:

 Acutandra amieti Bouyer, Drumont & Santos-Silva, 2012
 Acutandra araucana (Bosq, 1951)
 Acutandra barclayi Bouyer, Drumont & Santos-Silva, 2012
 Acutandra beninensis (Murray, 1862)
 Acutandra camiadei Bouyer, Drumont & Santos-Silva, 2012
 Acutandra caterinoi Lingafelter & Tishechkin, 2017
 Acutandra comoriana (Fairmaire, 1895)
 Acutandra conradti (Kolbe, 1893)
 Acutandra dasilvai Bouyer, Drumont & Santos-Silva, 2012
 Acutandra degeerii (Thomson, 1867)
 Acutandra delahayei Bouyer, Drumont & Santos-Silva, 2012
 Acutandra gabonica (Thomson, 1958)
 Acutandra gaetani Bouyer, Drumont & Santos-Silva, 2012
 Acutandra garnieri Bouyer, Drumont & Santos-Silva, 2012
 Acutandra grobbelaarae Bouyer, Drumont & Santos-Silva, 2012
 Acutandra hugoi Bouyer, Drumont & Santos-Silva, 2012
 Acutandra jolyi Bouyer, Drumont & Santos-Silva, 2012
 Acutandra leduci Bouyer, Drumont & Santos-Silva, 2012
 Acutandra leonardi Bouyer, Drumont & Santos-Silva, 2012
 Acutandra lucasi Bouyer, Drumont & Santos-Silva, 2012
 Acutandra murrayi (Lameere, 1912)
 Acutandra noellae Bouyer, Drumont & Santos-Silva, 2012
 Acutandra oremansi Bouyer, Drumont & Santos-Silva, 2012
 Acutandra plenevauxae Bouyer, Drumont & Santos-Silva, 2012
 Acutandra punctatissima (Thomson, 1861)
 Acutandra quentini Bouyer, Drumont & Santos-Silva, 2012
 Acutandra ubitiara (Santos-Silva & Martins, 2000)
 Acutandra vingerhoedti Bouyer, Drumont & Santos-Silva, 2012

References

Parandrinae